Réal Cloutier (born July 30, 1956) is a Canadian former professional ice hockey player. Cloutier spent five prolific seasons as a winger in the World Hockey Association (WHA) with the Quebec Nordiques. After the WHA folded, he played an additional five seasons in the National Hockey League (NHL), still at a point-a-game scoring pace, with the Quebec Nordiques and the Buffalo Sabres.

Playing career
As a youth, Cloutier played in four consecutive Quebec International Pee-Wee Hockey Tournaments from 1966 to 1969, with a minor ice hockey team from Orsainville, Quebec City.

Touted as one of the most promising prospects in the history of the Quebec Major Junior Hockey League, Cloutier played junior hockey for the Quebec Remparts, leading his team to back to back Memorial Cup finals in 1973 and 1974. His final season with the Remparts saw him score 216 points to lead the team in scoring.

In 1974, the National Hockey League (NHL) made a brief exception to allow teenagers to play, but Cloutier signed with the Quebec Nordiques of the World Hockey Association (WHA) and made an immediate impact in his 1974–75 rookie season. He scored 26 goals and helped the Nordiques to the AVCO Cup finals.

The next season saw Cloutier break into stardom, as he scored 60 goals to begin a streak of four seasons of at least 56 goals. In 1976–77 season, he scored 66 goals and 141 points to lead the WHA in scoring, adding 14 goals and 13 assists in 17 playoff games to lead the Nordiques to their only AVCO Cup championship. His best goal scoring season came in the WHA's final season of 1978–79, when he scored 75 goals, at the time the third highest total in the combined WHA and NHL professional history, behind Bobby Hull (77 goals, 1974–75 WHA season) and Phil Esposito (76 goals, 1970–71 NHL season).

Prior to the WHA's merger with the NHL in 1979, Cloutier's NHL rights belonged to the Chicago Black Hawks, which had selected him in the 1976 NHL Amateur Draft. The incoming WHA teams had a maximum of four "priority selections", up to two skaters and two goaltenders, that they could protect from being reclaimed by the NHL team that held their rights. In order to save their priority selections for defencemen Paul Baxter and Garry Lariviere, Quebec traded its first round draft choice (which would turn into future superstar Denis Savard) to Chicago in order to retain Cloutier. He proved to be a consistent scorer in the NHL, scoring 42 goals in 1979–80, and, although he was slowed by injuries, 37 and 28 goals his last two full seasons with the Nordiques.

Cloutier's time in Quebec came to an end as he, along with the Nordiques' first-round draft pick, was traded on June 8, 1983 to the Buffalo Sabres in exchange for Tony McKegney, André Savard, and Jean-François Sauvé. In Buffalo he reportedly clashed with Sabres' coach Scotty Bowman, who had a long history of benching offensive players who he felt were not paying sufficient attention to defensive play, and although he scored a credible 24 goals and 60 points in his only full season for the Sabres, he was sent to the minor leagues the next year, retiring thereafter at the age of 28.

When the WHA folded, Cloutier stood as the fourth leading scorer in WHA history, with 283 goals, 283 assists and 566 points in 369 games, adding 33 goals and 30 assists in 48 playoff games. In 317 NHL games, he scored 344 points.

Awards
 Named to the WHA Second All-Star Team in 1976, 1977 and 1978.
 Named to the WHA First All-Star Team in 1979.
 Won the Bill Hunter Trophy as the WHA's scoring leader in 1977 and 1979.
 Played in the NHL All-Star Game in 1980.

Records
 Third all-time in the WHA for goals scored, eleventh in assists and fourth in points.
 Second player to score a hat trick in his NHL debut, 36 years after Alex Smart first achieved the feat in 1943.
 He is the youngest pro hockey player in history to score 60 goals in a season. (19 years, 251 days)
 He was the youngest pro hockey player in history to score 100 goals (20 years, 89 days) until he was passed by Mark Napier
 He was the youngest pro hockey player in history to score 200 goals (21 years, 229 days) until he was passed by Wayne Gretzky
 He was the youngest pro hockey player in history to score 300 goals (23 years, 124 days) until he was passed by Wayne Gretzky
 He was the youngest pro hockey player in history to score 400 goals (26 years, 209 days) until he was passed by Wayne Gretzky

Career statistics

References

External links

1956 births
Living people
Buffalo Sabres players
Chicago Blackhawks draft picks
Flint Generals players
French Quebecers
Ice hockey people from Quebec City
National Hockey League first-round draft picks
Quebec Nordiques (WHA) draft picks
Quebec Nordiques (WHA) players
Quebec Nordiques players
Quebec Remparts players
Rochester Americans players
Canadian ice hockey right wingers